The Bagaduce River is a tidal river in the Hancock County, Maine that empties into Penobscot Bay near the town of Castine.

In 2014, residents of Penobscot raised concerns over the rapidly growing oyster farming on the Bagaduce River.

See also
List of rivers of Maine

External links
 Bagaduce Watershed Association

References

Maine Streamflow Data from the USGS
Maine Watershed Data From Environmental Protection Agency

Penobscot Bay
Rivers of Hancock County, Maine
Rivers of Maine